The Basketligan Finals MVP award is handed out to the Most Valuable Player in the Finals of the Basketligan, the highest Swedish basketball tier.

Winners

References

Basketball most valuable player awards
Finals MVP